Tanglewood Guitars is an English manufacturer of stringed instruments, including electric, steel-string acoustic and classical guitars, bass guitars, banjos, mandolins, ukuleles, and guitar amplifiers.

Instruments are designed in the United Kingdom and manufactured in China.

History
Tanglewood Guitars was founded in London in 1988 and later moved to Biggin Hill, Kent, and opened additional warehouse space in Wetherby, Yorkshire. In 2005, the company began distributing their products in the United States. Tanglewood Guitars received a sales award from MI Pro Trade magazine in 2007, 2008 and 2009. Tanglewood guitars are sold in more than 40 countries. The product range over time has diversified from acoustics, such as the TW line, through to many models and ranges. These include solid-body electrics inspired by solid body Fender (FST), Gibson (TE), or Rickenbacker (AR designs), hollow-body models inspired by the Telecaster Thinline or Gibson 335, and in-house designs such as the TSB range.

References

External links 
 Official website

Guitar manufacturing companies
Ukulele makers
Musical instrument manufacturing companies based in London
1988 establishments in England